Howard Goldblatt (born 1939) is a literary translator of numerous works of contemporary Chinese (mainland China & Taiwan) fiction, including The Taste of Apples by Huang Chunming and The Execution of Mayor Yin by Chen Ruoxi. Goldblatt also translated works of Chinese novelist and 2012 Nobel Prize in Literature winner Mo Yan, including six of Mo Yan's novels and collections of stories. He was a Research Professor of Chinese at the University of Notre Dame from 2002 to 2011.

Biography
Goldblatt encountered Chinese for the first time as a young man, during his tour of duty with the US Navy, sent to military base in Taiwan at the beginning of the 1960s. He stayed there and studied at the Mandarin Center for two more years before returning to the US. He then enrolled at the Chinese language program of the San Francisco State University. Goldblatt received a B.A. from Long Beach State College, an M.A. from San Francisco State University in 1971, and a Ph.D. from Indiana University in 1974.

Following criticism of Mo Yan's political stance after winning the Nobel Prize, Goldblatt wrote a defence of him in The Guardian.

He worked as a professor of Chinese literature at San Francisco State University, University of Colorado-Boulder and University of Notre Dame.

Awards
2000 National Translation Award for translation of Notes of a Desolate Man by Chu T’ien-wen
2009 Guggenheim Fellowship

Works

Selected translations 

 
 
 
 
 
 
  - American Literary Translators Association Translation of the Year

Edited volumes

References

External links
 Howard Goldblatt talks about Mo Yan, the Nobel Prize, translation, and other matters of interest
 Granta interview with Howard Goldblat (11 December 2012)
 Howard Goldblatt on Worldcat

1939 births
Living people
University of Notre Dame people
California State University, Long Beach alumni
San Francisco State University alumni
Indiana University alumni
Chinese–English translators
Literary translators
20th-century American translators
21st-century American translators